An ecclesiastical university is a special type of higher education school recognised by the Canon law of the Catholic Church. It is one of two types of universities recognised, the other type being the Catholic university. Every single ecclesiastical university is a pontifical university, while only a few Catholic universities are pontifical.

Some independent institutions, schools or university faculties, even at non-pontifical universities, can be ecclesiastical institutes, ecclesiastical schools or ecclesiastical faculties and may also be given charters by the Holy See to grant ecclesiastical degrees, usually in one or two specific fields.

Ecclesiastical universities are licensed to grant ecclesiastical degrees in:
Theology, including biblical studies and Church history
Ecclesiastical Philosophy
Canon Law

These ecclesiastical degrees are prerequisites to certain offices in the Roman Catholic Church, especially considering that bishop candidates are selected mainly from priests who are doctors of sacred theology (S.T.D.) or canon law (J.C.D.) and that ecclesiastical judges and attorneys must at least be licentiates of canon law (J.C.L.).

Ecclesiastical universities and faculties

Argentina
 Facultades de Filosofía y Teología, San Miguel

Australia
 Catholic Institute of Sydney, Sydney

Brazil
 Faculdade Jesuíta de Filosofia e Teologia, Belo Horizonte

Cameroon
 Catholic Institute of Yaoundé, Catholic University of Central Africa, Yaoundé

Canada
 Faculté de Théologie et de Sciences Religieuses, Université Laval, Québec
 Pontifical Institute of Mediaeval Studies, Toronto. It uniquely among all ecclesiastical faculties grants the licentiate in Medieval Studies (L.M.S., a post-doctorate earned degree), and the doctorate (M.S.D.) which is awarded on the basis of a career. It is an independent research institute at the University of Toronto.
 Regis College, University of Toronto, Toronto

Chile
 Pontifical Catholic University of Chile, Santiago
 Pontifical Catholic University of Valparaíso, Valparaiso

Congo (Democratic Republic of the Congo)
 Facultés Catholiques de Kinshasa, Kinshasa

Croatia
 Faculty of Catholic Theology at the University of Zagreb, Zagreb

Dominican Republic
 Seminario Pontificio Santo Tomás de Aquino, Santo Domingo

France
 Centre Sèvres - Facultés Théologique et Philosophique des Jésuites, Paris
 Faculté de Théologie et de Philosophie (Université Catholique de Lyon), Paris
 Faculté de Théologie (Université Catholique de l'Ouest), Angers
 Faculté de Théologie (Université Catholique de Lille), Lille
 Faculté de Théologie Notre-Dame, Paris

Germany
 Sankt Georgen Graduate School of Philosophy and Theology, Frankfurt

Hong Kong
 Holy Spirit Seminary, Wong Chuk Hang

Hungary
 Faculty of Theology, Pázmány Péter Catholic University, Budapest

India
 Pontifical Athenaeum of Philosophy and Religion, Pune
 Pontifical Institute of Theology and Philosophy, Alwaye, Kerala
 Pontifical Oriental Institute of Religious Studies, Kottayam
 St. Peter's Pontifical Institute of Philosophy and Theology, Bangalore
 Dharmaram Vidya Kshetram Pontifical Athenaeum of Philosophy and Theology, Bangalore
 Vidyajyoti Faculty of Theology, Delhi
 Satya Nilayam Institute of Philosophy and Culture, Chennai
 Faculty of Theology of Ranchi, Ranchi

Indonesia
 Wedabhakti Pontifical Faculty of Theology, Yogyakarta

Ireland
 St Patrick's College, Maynooth

Israel
 École Biblique et Archéologique Française de Jérusalem, Jerusalem
 Pontificium Institutum Biblicum, Jerusalem campus
 Studium Biblicum Franciscanum, Jerusalem
 Studium Theologicum Salesianum, Jerusalem campus

Italy

(Pontifical Universities and Atheneum are listed in the Pontifical Universities article, while here are the Pontifical Institutes and Faculties.)
 Pontifical Institute "John Paul II" for Marriage and Family Sciences, Rome
 Pontifical Institute of Arab and Islamic Studies, Rome
 Pontifical Institute of Christian Archaeology, Rome
 Pontifical Institute of Sacred Music, Rome
 Pontifical Institute of Ambrosian Sacred Music, Milan
 Pontifical Faculty of Education "Auxilium," Rome
 Pontifical Faculty of Theology and Institute of Spirituality "Teresianum," Rome
 Pontifical Theological Faculty "Marianum," Rome
 Pontifical Theological Faculty of St. Bonaventure "Seraphicum," Rome
 Pontifical Institute for Biblical Studies "Biblicum," Rome
 Pontifical Institute for Eastern Studies "Orientale," Rome
 Pontifical Institute for Patristic Sciences "Augustinianum," Rome
 Pontifical Institute of Theology of Consecrated Life "Claretianum," Rome
 Pontifical Institute of Moral Theology "Accademia Alfonsiana," Rome
 Pontifical Institute for Pastoral Ministry "Redemptor Hominis," Rome
 Pontifical Institute of Latinitas, Rome
 Pontifical Institute of Sacred Liturgy, Rome
 Pontifical Institute of Utriusque Iuris, Rome
 Pontifical Theological Faculty of Southern Italy, Naples
 Pontifical Theological Faculty of Sardinia, Cagliari
 Pontifical Theological Faculty of Sicily «San Giovanni Evangelista», Palermo
 Theological Faculty of Apulia, Bari
 Theological Faculty of Central Italy, Florence
 Theological Faculty of Emilia-Romagna, Bologna
 Theological Faculty of Northern Italy, Milan, Turin, Genoa
 Theological Faculty of the Triveneto, Padua
 Faculty of Canon Law «San Pio X», Venice
 «Sophia» University Institute, Loppiano
 Academic Theological Study Bressanone, Bressanone (affiliated with the Faculty of Theology of the University of Innsbruck in Austria)

Lebanon
 Faculté de Théologie, Université Saint-Esprit de Kaslik, Jounieh

Malta
 Faculty of Theology, Tal-Virtù

Nigeria
 Catholic Institute of West Africa, Port Harcourt

Philippines
 Loyola School of Theology, Ateneo de Manila University, Quezon City

Poland
 Pontifical Faculty of Theology in Warsaw, Warsaw
 Pontifical Faculty of Theology in Wrocław, Wrocław
 Pontifical University of John Paul II, Kraków

Spain
 Ateneo Universitario Sant Pacià, Barcelona
 Universidad Eclesiástica San Dámaso, Madrid
 Faculty of Canon Law (at Universidad Católica de Valencia San Vicente Martir), Valencia
 Faculty of Theology (at Universidad de Deusto), Bilbao
 Faculty of Theology (at Universidad Loyola Andalucía), Granada
 Faculty of Theology "San Esteban," Salamanca
 Faculty of Theology "San Isidoro de Sevilla," Sevilla
 Faculty of Theology "San Vicente Ferrer," Valencia
 Theological Faculty of Northern Spain - Burgos Campus
 Theological Faculty of Northern Spain - Vitoria Campus

Switzerland
 Faculty of Theology (at Université de Fribourg), Fribourg
 Faculty of Theology (at Università di Lucerna), Lucerne
 Faculty of Theology (at Università della Svizzera italiana), Lugano
 Theological School of Chur (German: Theologische Hochschule Chur), Chur

Taiwan
 Fu Jen Faculty of Theology of St. Robert Bellarmine, New Taipei City

United Kingdom
 Mater Ecclesiae College of St Mary's University, Twickenham, formerly the Bellarmine Institute of Heythrop College, University of London

United States
 Boston College School of Theology and Ministry (at Boston College), Brighton, MA
 Ecclesiastical Faculty of Theology (at the University of Saint Mary of the Lake), Mundelein, IL
 Jesuit School of Theology of Santa Clara University (at Santa Clara University), Berkeley, CA
 Pontifical Faculty of the Immaculate Conception (at the Dominican House of Studies), Washington, DC
 St. Mary's Seminary and University, Baltimore, MD

Additionally, numerous other United States institutions have arrangements by which they may grant pontifical degrees, including:
 Archdiocese of New York's St. Joseph's Seminary, Dunwoodie, Yonkers, NY – offers the S.T.B. through the Pontifical University of St. Thomas Aquinas (Angelicum) in Rome, Italy.
 Kenrick–Glennon Seminary, Shrewsbury, MO - offers the S.T.B. through the Pontifical Gregorian University in Rome, Italy.
 Mount Angel Abbey's Seminary, Saint Benedict, OR - offers the S.T.B. through the Pontifical Atheneum of St. Anselm in Rome, Italy.
 Mount St. Mary's University Seminary, Emmitsburg, MD - offers the S.T.B. through the Pontifical Faculty of the Immaculate Conception.
 Sacred Heart Major Seminary, Detroit, MI - offers both the S.T.B. and S.T.L through the Pontifical University of St. Thomas Aquinas (Angelicum) in Rome, Italy
 Saint Patrick's Seminary and University, Menlo Park, CA - offers the S.T.B. through the Pontifical Faculty of the Immaculate Conception.
 Pontifical College Josephinum, Columbus, OH - offers the S.T.B. through the Pontifical University of St. Thomas Aquinas (Angelicum) in Rome, Italy.

References

Catholic universities and colleges
Types of university or college